Condesito was a cargo ship that sank on 27 September 1973 near Las Galletas on the south coast of Tenerife in the Canary Islands and is now a well known recreational dive site. The ship was transporting cement for the construction of Los Cristianos.

Last voyage
The ship ran aground about 50 meters (55 yards; 165 feet) from where the Punta Rasca Lighthouse later was constructed. There were no deaths.

Recreational dive site

References

Shipwrecks in the Atlantic Ocean
Maritime incidents in 1973